The 1950 Philadelphia Phillies won the National League pennant by two games over the Brooklyn Dodgers. Nicknamed the "Whiz Kids" because of the youth of their roster, they went on to lose the World Series to the New York Yankees in four straight games.

Previous off-season 
 October 3, 1949: Schoolboy Rowe was released by the Phillies.
 November 17, 1949: Milo Candini was drafted by the Phillies from the Oakland Oaks in the 1949 rule 5 draft.
 Prior to 1950 season: Bob Bowman was signed as an amateur free agent by the Phillies.

On January 10, 1950, owner Bob Carpenter announced that the club had officially abandoned the nickname "Blue Jays" and would be the "Phillies". The club had adopted the nickname in 1944 but it never caught on among fans.

City Series 
The pre-season 1950 City Series was planned for three games prior to Opening Day. Snow flurries and cold weather in Philadelphia caused the cancellation of the first game. The Athletics beat the Phillies 7–4 and the Phillies won the following game 11–2.

Regular season

Season standings

Record vs. opponents

Game log

|- style="background:#bfb"
| 1 || April 18 || Dodgers || 9–1 || Robin Roberts (1–0) || Don Newcombe (0–1) || None || 29,074 || 1–0
|- style="background:#fbb"
| 2 || April 19 || Dodgers || 5–7 || Bud Podbielan (1–0) || Russ Meyer (0–1) || None || 8,450 || 1–1
|- style="background:#bbb"
| – || April 20 || Dodgers || colspan=6 | Postponed (rain); Makeup: September 8
|- style="background:#fffdd0"
| 3 || April 21 || @ Braves || 2–2 (7) || None || None || None || 7,308 || 1–1–1
|- style="background:#fbb"
| 4 || April 22 || @ Braves || 2–3 || Warren Spahn (2–0) || Curt Simmons (0–1) || None || 7,607 ||| 1–2–1
|- style="background:#fbb"
| 5 || April 23 (1) || @ Braves || 3–4 || Johnny Sain (2–0) || Blix Donnelly (0–1) || None || see 2nd game || 1–3–1
|- style="background:#bfb"
| 6 || April 23 (2) || @ Braves || 6–5 || Jim Konstanty (1–0) || Bobby Hogue (0–1) || None || 10,302 || 2–3–1
|- style="background:#bbb"
| – || April 24 || @ Giants || colspan=6 | Postponed (rain and cold); Makeup: August 20
|- style="background:#fbb"
| 7 || April 25 || @ Giants || 4–8 || Larry Jansen (1–1) || Russ Meyer (0–2) || None || 4,940 || 2–4–1
|- style="background:#fbb"
| 8 || April 26 || @ Dodgers || 4–5 (10) || Willie Ramsdell (1–0) || Blix Donnelly (0–2) || None || 21,556 || 2–5–1
|- style="background:#bfb"
| 9 || April 27 || @ Dodgers || 9–2 || Robin Roberts (2–0) || Preacher Roe (1–1) || None || 5,488 || 3–5–1
|- style="background:#bfb"
| 10 || April 28 || Braves || 6–1 || Curt Simmons (1–1) || Johnny Sain (2–1) || None || 22,231 || 4–5–1
|- style="background:#bfb"
| 11 || April 29 || Braves || 2–1 || Bob Miller (1–0) || Vern Bickford (0–2) || None || 5,064 || 5–5–1
|- style="background:#fbb"
| 12 || April 30 (1) || Braves || 1–4 || Normie Roy (1–0) || Russ Meyer (0–3) || None || see 2nd game || 5–6–1
|- style="background:#bfb"
| 13 || April 30 (2) || Braves || 9–3 || Robin Roberts (3–0) || Dick Donovan (0–2) || None || 14,201 || 6–6–1
|-

|- style="background:#fbb"
| 14 || May 2 || @ Cubs || 8–10 || Bob Rush (2–0) || Ken Heintzelman (0–1) || Dutch Leonard (2) || 6,279 || 6–7–1
|- style="background:#bfb"
| 15 || May 3 || @ Cubs || 5–2 || Ken Johnson (1–0) || Johnny Klippstein (0–1) || Jim Konstanty (1) || 4,071 || 7–7–1
|- style="background:#bfb"
| 16 || May 4 || @ Cardinals || 9–6 || Curt Simmons (2–1) || Gerry Staley (1–2) || Jim Konstanty (2) || 9,871 || 8–7–1
|- style="background:#fbb"
| 17 || May 5 || @ Cardinals || 2–3 || Harry Brecheen (2–1) || Robin Roberts (3–1) || None || 12,302 || 8–8–1
|- style="background:#bfb"
| 18 || May 6 || @ Cardinals || 11–7 || Bob Miller (2–0) || Max Lanier (1–1) || Jim Konstanty (3) || 9,730 || 9–8–1
|- style="background:#bfb"
| 19 || May 7 (1) || @ Reds || 6–0 || Ken Heintzelman (1–1) || Howie Fox (1–2) || None || see 2nd game || 10–8–1
|- style="background:#bfb"
| 20 || May 7 (2) || @ Reds || 6–4 || Curt Simmons (3–1) || Ewell Blackwell (1–1) || None || 13,313 || 11–8–1
|- style="background:#bfb"
| 21 || May 8 || @ Reds || 6–5 || Ken Johnson (2–0) || Herm Wehmeier (1–3) || Bob Miller (1) || 5,141 || 12–8–1
|- style="background:#bbb"
| – || May 10 || @ Pirates || colspan=6 | Postponed (rain); Makeup: July 24
|- style="background:#bfb"
| 22 || May 11 || @ Pirates || 3–2 || Robin Roberts (4–1) || Murry Dickson (2–3) || None || 28,452 || 13–8–1
|- style="background:#bfb"
| 23 || May 13 || Giants || 7–1 || Curt Simmons (4–1) || Dave Koslo (1–3) || None || 12,596 || 14–8–1
|- style="background:#fbb"
| 24 || May 14 (1) || Giants || 3–4 || Larry Jansen (2–3) || Ken Heintzelman (1–2) || None || see 2nd game || 14–9–1
|- style="background:#bfb"
| 25 || May 14 (2) || Giants || 9–7 || Jim Konstanty (2–0) || Sheldon Jones (1–4) || Robin Roberts (1) || 25,769 || 15–9–1
|- style="background:#bfb"
| 26 || May 16 || Reds || 1–0 || Robin Roberts (5–1) || Ewell Blackwell (2–2) || None || 16,041 || 16–9–1
|- style="background:#bfb"
| 27 || May 17 || Reds || 5–4 || Ken Johnson (3–0) || Herm Wehmeier (1–4) || None || 12,655 || 17–9–1
|- style="background:#bbb"
| – || May 18 || Reds || colspan=6 | Postponed (rain and wet grounds); Makeup: August 1 as a traditional double-header
|- style="background:#bbb"
| – || May 19 || Cubs || colspan=6 | Postponed (rain); Makeup: July 25 as a traditional double-header
|- style="background:#fbb"
| 28 || May 20 || Cubs || 2–7 || Bob Rush (5–0) || Curt Simmons (4–2) || None || 4,020 || 17–10–1
|- style="background:#fbb"
| 29 || May 21 (1) || Cardinals || 5–6 || Gerry Staley (3–3) || Robin Roberts (5–2) || Howie Pollet (1) || see 2nd game || 17–11–1
|- style="background:#bfb"
| 30 || May 21 (2) || Cardinals || 4–2 || Curt Simmons (5–2) || Cloyd Boyer (1–1) || None || 32,986 || 18–11–1
|- style="background:#fbb"
| 31 || May 23 || Pirates || 0–6 || Bill Macdonald (1–0) || Russ Meyer (0–4) || None || 12,428 || 18–12–1
|- style="background:#bfb"
| 32 || May 24 || Pirates || 6–3 || Jim Konstanty (3–0) || Bill Werle (3–2) || None || 18,993 || 19–12–1
|- style="background:#bfb"
| 33 || May 25 || Pirates || 3–0 || Bob Miller (3–0) || Cliff Chambers (5–4) || None || 5,265 || 20–12–1
|- style="background:#bfb"
| 34 || May 26 || @ Giants || 3–2 || Robin Roberts (6–2) || Jack Kramer (0–2) || None || 17,782 || 21–12–1
|- style="background:#bfb"
| 35 || May 27 || @ Giants || 8–5 || Curt Simmons (6–2) || Sheldon Jones (2–6) || Jim Konstanty (4) || 13,273 || 22–12–1
|- style="background:#bfb"
| 36 || May 28 (1) || @ Giants || 5–2 (11) || Jim Konstanty (4–0) || Andy Hansen (0–1) || None || 23,956 || 23–12–1
|- style="background:#fbb"
| 37 || May 28 (2) || @ Giants || 1–3 || Dave Koslo (3–4) || Ken Heintzelman (1–3) || None || 23,986 || 23–13–1
|- style="background:#fbb"
| 38 || May 30 (1) || @ Dodgers || 6–7 (10) || Preacher Roe (5–2) || Jim Konstanty (4–1) || None || 18,884 || 23–14–1
|- style="background:#fbb"
| 39 || May 30 (2) || @ Dodgers || 4–6 || Jack Banta (4–1) || Russ Meyer (0–5) || Ralph Branca (1) || 34,700 || 23–15–1
|-

|- style="background:#bfb"
| 40 || June 1 || @ Cubs || 8–4 || Curt Simmons (7–2) || Frank Hiller (3–1) || Jim Konstanty (5) || 9,812 || 24–15–1
|- style="background:#bbb"
| – || June 2 || @ Cubs || colspan=6 | Postponed (wet grounds); Makeup: July 18 as a traditional double-header
|- style="background:#bfb"
| 41 || June 3 || @ Cubs || 6–2 || Bubba Church (1–0) || Bob Rush (6–2) || Jim Konstanty (6) || not available || 25–15–1
|- style="background:#fbb"
| 42 || June 4 || @ Cardinals || 2–6 || Max Lanier (4–2) || Ken Heintzelman (1–4) || None || 30,956 || 25–16–1
|- style="background:#bfb"
| 43 || June 5 || @ Cardinals || 6–5 || Robin Roberts (7–2) || Red Munger (2–2) || None || 15,604 || 26–16–1
|- style="background:#fbb"
| 44 || June 6 || @ Cardinals || 4–5 || Howie Pollet (5–3) || Curt Simmons (7–3) || None || 16,328 || 26–17–1
|- style="background:#bfb"
| 45 || June 7 || @ Reds || 4–0 || Bob Miller (4–0) || Willie Ramsdell (2–6) || None || 8,220 || 27–17–1
|- style="background:#fbb"
| 46 || June 8 || @ Reds || 4–8 || Ken Raffensberger (5–5) || Russ Meyer (0–6) || None || 4,102 || 27–18–1
|- style="background:#bbb"
| – || June 9 || @ Reds || colspan=6 | Postponed (rain); Makeup: July 22 as a traditional double-header
|- style="background:#bbb"
| – || June 10 || @ Pirates || colspan=6 | Postponed (rain); Makeup: July 19 as a traditional double-header
|- style="background:#bfb"
| 47 || June 11 (1) || @ Pirates || 7–6 || Jim Konstanty (5–1) || Vern Law (0–1) || None || see 2nd game || 28–18–1
|- style="background:#fbb"
| 48 || June 11 (2) || @ Pirates || 4–5 (12) || Bill Werle (4–4) || Blix Donnelly (0–3) || None || 33,217 || 28–19–1
|- style="background:#fbb"
| 49 || June 13 || Cardinals || 3–6 || Harry Brecheen (4–3) || Curt Simmons (7–4) || None || 28,587 || 28–20–1
|- style="background:#fbb"
| 50 || June 14 || Cardinals || 2–4 || Max Lanier (6–2) || Ken Heintzelman (1–5) || None || 15,563 || 28–21–1
|- style="background:#bbb"
| – || June 15 || Cardinals || colspan=6 | Postponed (rain); Makeup: August 7
|- style="background:#bbb"
| – || June 16 || Reds || colspan=6 | Postponed (rain); Makeup: August 3
|- style="background:#bfb"
| 51 || June 17 || Reds || 5–2 || Robin Roberts (8–2) || Ewell Blackwell (4–7) || None || 7,669 || 29–21–1
|- style="background:#bfb"
| 52 || June 18 (1) || Reds || 4–3 || Curt Simmons (8–4) || Herm Wehmeier (3–8) || None || see 2nd game || 30–21–1
|- style="background:#bfb"
| 53 || June 18 (2) || Reds || 4–2 || Bob Miller (5–0) || Howie Fox (1–5) || None || 20,495 || 31–21–1
|- style="background:#bfb"
| 54 || June 20 || Pirates || 7–3 || Russ Meyer (1–6) || Vern Law (0–2) || None || 13,597 || 32–21–1
|- style="background:#fbb"
| 55 || June 21 || Pirates || 3–5 || Bill Macdonald (3–1) || Robin Roberts (8–3) || Bill Werle (6) || 18,632 || 32–22–1
|- style="background:#bfb"
| 56 || June 22 || Pirates || 7–4 || Bob Miller (6–0) || Hank Borowy (0–2) || None || 5,326 || 33–22–1
|- style="background:#fbb"
| 57 || June 23 || Cubs || 4–7 || Doyle Lade (3–1) || Curt Simmons (8–5) || Paul Minner (3) || 21,030 || 33–23–1
|- style="background:#bfb"
| 58 || June 24 || Cubs || 5–4 || Russ Meyer (2–6) || Frank Hiller (4–2) || Jim Konstanty (7) || 7,195 || 34–23–1
|- style="background:#fbb"
| 59 || June 25 (1) || Cubs || 8–11 || Johnny Schmitz (8–3) || Jim Konstanty (5–2) || Doyle Lade (2) || see 2nd game || 34–24–1
|- style="background:#bfb"
| 60 || June 25 (2) || Cubs || 2–1 || Robin Roberts (9–3) || Bob Rush (8–6) || None || 18,484 || 35–24–1
|- style="background:#bfb"
| 61 || June 27 || @ Braves || 3–2 || Curt Simmons (9–5) || Warren Spahn (9–8) || Jim Konstanty (8) || 13,361 || 36–24–1
|- style="background:#fbb"
| 62 || June 28 || @ Braves || 1–3 || Johnny Sain (10–5) || Russ Meyer (2–7) || None || 18,724 || 36–25–1
|- style="background:#fbb"
| 63 || June 29 || @ Braves || 2–3 || Vern Bickford (7–6) || Ken Heintzelman (1–6) || None || 13,980 || 36–26–1
|- style="background:#bfb"
| 64 || June 30 || Dodgers || 8–5 || Jim Konstanty (6–2) || Don Newcombe (7–3) || Bubba Church (1) || 31,555 || 37–26–1
|-

|- style="background:#bfb"
| 65 || July 1 || Dodgers || 6–4 || Bob Miller (7–0) || Bud Podbielan (5–4) || Jim Konstanty (9) || 18,761 || 38–26–1
|- style="background:#bfb"
| 66 || July 2 (1) || Dodgers || 6–4 || Russ Meyer (3–7) || Ralph Branca (2–4) || Jim Konstanty (10) || see 2nd game || 39–26–1
|- style="background:#fffdd0"
| 67 || July 2 (2) || Dodgers || 8–8 (10) || None || None || None || 35,118 || 39–26–2
|- style="background:#fbb"
| 68 || July 3 || Braves || 1–3 || Vern Bickford (8–6) || Ken Heintzelman (1–7) || None || 11,162 || 39–27–2
|- style="background:#bfb"
| 69 || July 4 (1) || Braves || 14–5 || Robin Roberts (10–3) || Normie Roy (3–3) || None || see 2nd game || 40–27–2
|- style="background:#fbb"
| 70 || July 4 (2) || Braves || 9–12 || Bobby Hogue (3–2) || Jim Konstanty (6–3) || Warren Spahn (1) || 21,190 || 40–28–2
|- style="background:#bfb"
| 71 || July 5 || Giants || 10–3 || Russ Meyer (4–7) || Clint Hartung (3–3) || None || 17,771 || 41–28–2
|- style="background:#bfb"
| 72 || July 6 || Giants || 9–6 || Bob Miller (8–0) || Sheldon Jones (6–10) || Jim Konstanty (11) || 8,709 || 42–28–2
|- style="background:#bfb"
| 73 || July 7 || @ Dodgers || 7–2 || Curt Simmons (10–5) || Ralph Branca (2–5) || None || 28,585 || 43–28–2
|- style="background:#bfb"
| 74 || July 8 || @ Dodgers || 4–1 || Jim Konstanty (7–3) || Don Newcombe (7–5) || None || 20,714 || 44–28–2
|- style="background:#fbb"
| 75 || July 9 || @ Dodgers || 3–7 || Erv Palica (2–1) || Russ Meyer (4–8) || None || 20,895 || 44–29–2
|- style="background:#bbcaff;"
| – || July 11 ||colspan="7" |1950 Major League Baseball All-Star Game at Comiskey Park in Chicago
|- style="background:#bfb"
| 76 || July 13 || @ Cardinals || 3–2 || Curt Simmons (11–5) || Howie Pollet (9–6) || None || 24,471 || 45–29–2
|- style="background:#fbb"
| 77 || July 14 || @ Cardinals || 2–4 || Gerry Staley (8–6) || Robin Roberts (10–4) || None || 25,529 || 45–30–2
|- style="background:#fbb"
| 78 || July 15 || @ Cardinals || 6–8 || Fred Martin (3–1) || Jim Konstanty (7–4) || Al Brazle (5) || 20,219 || 45–31–2
|- style="background:#fbb"
| 79 || July 16 (1) || @ Cubs || 0–8 || Monk Dubiel (4–3) || Russ Meyer (4–9) || None || see 2nd game || 45–32–2
|- style="background:#fbb"
| 80 || July 16 (2) || @ Cubs || 3–10 || Doyle Lade (5–3) || Bob Miller (8–1) || None || 35,710 || 45–33–2
|- style="background:#bbb"
| – || July 17 || @ Cubs || colspan=6 | Postponed (rain); Makeup: August 28 (which later became a traditional double-header)
|- style="background:#fbb"
| 81 || July 18 (1) || @ Cubs || 2–5 || Paul Minner (4–5) || Robin Roberts (10–5) || None || see 2nd game || 45–34–2
|- style="background:#bfb"
| 82 || July 18 (2) || @ Cubs || 8–3 || Bubba Church (2–0) || Bob Rush (9–10) || None || 28,861 || 46–34–2
|- style="background:#bfb"
| 83 || July 19 (1) || @ Pirates || 3–2 (11) || Curt Simmons (12–5) || Bill Werle (5–8) || Jim Konstanty (12) || see 2nd game || 47–34–2
|- style="background:#fbb"
| 84 || July 19 (2) || @ Pirates || 2–4 || Bill Macdonald (4–3) || Russ Meyer (4–10) || None || 18,953 || 47–35–2
|- style="background:#fbb"
| 85 || July 20 || @ Pirates || 8–10 || Murry Dickson (5–10) || Blix Donnelly (0–4) || None || 7,291 || 47–36–2
|- style="background:#bfb"
| 86 || July 21 || @ Pirates || 4–1 || Bubba Church (3–0) || Mel Queen (3–8) || None || 34,016 || 48–36–2
|- style="background:#bfb"
| 87 || July 22 (1) || @ Reds || 2–0 || Robin Roberts (11–5) || Willie Ramsdell (5–8) || None || see 2nd game || 49–36–2
|- style="background:#fbb"
| 88 || July 22 (2) || @ Reds || 1–6 || Howie Fox (5–6) || Ken Heintzelman (1–8) || None || 13,215 || 49–37–2
|- style="background:#bfb"
| 89 || July 23 (1) || @ Reds || 12–4 || Curt Simmons (13–5) || Ken Raffensberger (9–11) || None || see 2nd game || 50–37–2
|- style="background:#bfb"
| 90 || July 23 (2) || @ Reds || 7–4 || Russ Meyer (5–10) || Ewell Blackwell (8–10) || Jim Konstanty (13) || 28,831 || 51–37–2
|- style="background:#fbb"
| 91 || July 24 || @ Pirates || 1–2 (6) || Bill Macdonald (5–3) || Bob Miller (8–2) || None || 15,431 || 51–38–2
|- style="background:#bfb"
| 92 || July 25 (1) || Cubs || 7–0 || Bubba Church (4–0) || Johnny Klippstein (1–3) || None || see 2nd game || 52–38–2
|- style="background:#bfb"
| 93 || July 25 (2) || Cubs || 1–0 || Robin Roberts (12–5) || Bob Rush (9–11) || None || 32,726 || 53–38–2
|- style="background:#bfb"
| 94 || July 26 || Cubs || 6–4 || Milo Candini (1–0) || Monk Dubiel (4–4) || Jim Konstanty (14) || 11,693 || 54–38–2
|- style="background:#bfb"
| 95 || July 27 || Cubs || 13–3 || Curt Simmons (14–5) || Doyle Lade (5–5) || None || 7,343 || 55–38–2
|- style="background:#bfb"
| 96 || July 28 || Pirates || 4–1 || Bob Miller (9–2) || Bill Macdonald (5–4) || None || 7,343 || 56–38–2
|- style="background:#fbb"
| 97 || July 29 || Pirates || 4–7 || Bill Werle (6–8) || Bubba Church (4–1) || None || 10,252 || 56–39–2
|- style="background:#bfb"
| 98 || July 30 (1) || Pirates || 10–0 || Robin Roberts (13–5) || Mel Queen (4–9) || None || see 2nd game || 57–39–2
|- style="background:#bfb"
| 99 || July 30 (2) || Pirates || 4–2 || Jim Konstanty (8–4) || Murry Dickson (5–11) || Russ Meyer (1) || 21,411 || 58–39–2
|-

|- style="background:#bfb"
| 100 || August 1 (1) || Reds || 6–4 || Bob Miller (10–2) || Frank Smith (1–4) || Jim Konstanty (15) || see 2nd game || 59–39–2
|- style="background:#fbb"
| 101 || August 1 (2) || Reds || 1–4 || Ewell Blackwell (10–11) || Curt Simmons (14–6) || None || 34,728 || 59–40–2
|- style="background:#bfb"
| 102 || August 2 || Reds || 2–0 || Bubba Church (5–1) || Willie Ramsdell (5–9) || None || 8,540 || 60–40–2
|- style="background:#bbb"
| – || August 3 || Reds || colspan=6 | Postponed (rain); Makeup: September 15 as a traditional double-header
|- style="background:#bfb"
| 103 || August 4 || Cardinals || 4–2 || Robin Roberts (14–5) || Howie Pollet (10–9) || None || 27,691 || 61–40–2
|- style="background:#bfb"
| 104 || August 5 || Cardinals || 2–1 || Russ Meyer (6–10) || Gerry Staley (10–9) || Jim Konstanty (16) || 21,869 || 62–40–2
|- style="background:#fbb"
| 105 || August 6 (1) || Cardinals || 1–7 || Cloyd Boyer (5–2) || Bob Miller (10–3) || None || see 2nd game || 62–41–2
|- style="background:#fbb"
| 106 || August 6 (2) || Cardinals || 0–2 || Max Lanier (10–4) || Bubba Church (5–2) || None || 31,914 || 62–42–2
|- style="background:#bfb"
| 107 || August 7 || Cardinals || 9–0 || Ken Johnson (4–0) || Harry Brecheen (6–8) || None || 25,251 || 63–42–2
|- style="background:#bfb"
| 108 || August 8 || @ Dodgers || 6–5 || Robin Roberts (15–5) || Don Newcombe (11–7) || Jim Konstanty (17) || 32,886 || 64–42–2
|- style="background:#bfb"
| 109 || August 9 || @ Dodgers || 5–4 || Russ Meyer (7–10) || Erv Palica (4–4) || Jim Konstanty (18) || 19,644 || 65–42–2
|- style="background:#bfb"
| 110 || August 10 || Giants || 6–5 (10) || Jim Konstanty (9–4) || Dave Koslo (11–9) || None || 33,032 || 66–42–2
|- style="background:#fbb"
| 111 || August 11 || Giants || 1–3 || Sal Maglie (10–3) || Curt Simmons (14–7) || None || 15,895 || 66–43–2
|- style="background:#bfb"
| 112 || August 12 || Giants || 5–4 (11) || Jim Konstanty (10–4) || Dave Koslo (11–10) || None || 14,955 || 67–43–2
|- style="background:#fbb"
| 113 || August 13 || Giants || 0–2 || Jim Hearn (4–2) || Ken Johnson (4–1) || None || 19,644 || 67–44–2
|- style="background:#bfb"
| 114 || August 15 || Braves || 9–1 || Curt Simmons (15–7) || Johnny Sain (16–9) || Jim Konstanty (19) || 32,215 || 68–44–2
|- style="background:#bfb"
| 115 || August 16 || Braves || 5–1 || Robin Roberts (16–5) || Vern Bickford (14–9) || None || 23,846 || 69–44–2
|- style="background:#fbb"
| 116 || August 18 || @ Giants || 4–7 || Jim Hearn (5–2) || Russ Meyer (7–11) || None || 26,086 || 69–45–2
|- style="background:#bbb"
| – || August 19 || @ Giants || colspan=6 | Postponed (rain); Makeup: September 27 as a traditional double-header
|- style="background:#bbb"
| – || August 20 (1) || @ Giants || colspan=6 | Postponed (rain); Makeup: August 21
|- style="background:#bbb"
| – || August 20 (2) || @ Giants || colspan=6 | Postponed (rain); Makeup: September 28 as a traditional double-header
|- style="background:#bfb"
| 117 || August 21 || @ Giants || 4–0 || Curt Simmons (16–7) || Larry Jansen (13–9) || None || 19,320 || 70–45–2
|- style="background:#bfb"
| 118 || August 22 || @ Reds || 4–3 || Robin Roberts (17–5) || Ken Raffensberger (12–14) || None || 11,660 || 71–45–2
|- style="background:#bfb"
| 119 || August 23 || @ Reds || 6–4 || Bob Miller (11–3) || Willie Ramsdell (6–11) || Jim Konstanty (20) || 5,964 || 72–45–2
|- style="background:#bfb"
| 120 || August 24 || @ Pirates || 4–2 || Bubba Church (6–2) || Vern Law (3–6) || None || 9,096 || 73–45–2
|- style="background:#bfb"
| 121 || August 25 || @ Pirates || 9–7 (15) || Jim Konstanty (11–4) || Cliff Chambers (10–14) || None || 25,686 || 74–45–2
|- style="background:#fbb"
| 122 || August 26 || @ Pirates || 4–14 || Murry Dickson (7–13) || Robin Roberts (17–6) || None || 12,157 || 74–46–2
|- style="background:#bfb"
| 123 || August 27 (1) || @ Cubs || 6–1 || Bubba Church (7–2) || Paul Minner (7–9) || None || see 2nd game || 75–46–2
|- style="background:#fffdd0"
| 124 || August 27 (2) || @ Cubs || 4–4 (11) || None || None || None || 38,944 || 75–46–3
|- style="background:#fbb"
| 125 || August 28 (1) || @ Cubs || 5–7 || Dutch Leonard (4–1) || Curt Simmons (16–8) || Johnny Vander Meer (1) || see 2nd game || 75–47–3
|- style="background:#bfb"
| 126 || August 28 (2) || @ Cubs || 9–5 || Jim Konstanty (12–4) || Johnny Klippstein (1–8) || None || 19,756 || 76–47–3
|- style="background:#bfb"
| 127 || August 29 || @ Cardinals || 5–3 || Robin Roberts (18–6) || Howie Pollet (12–11) || Jim Konstanty (21) || 27,058 || 77–47–3
|- style="background:#bfb"
| 128 || August 30 || @ Cardinals || 9–8 || Jim Konstanty (13–4) || Gerry Staley (11–11) || Curt Simmons (1) || 17,232 || 78–47–3
|-

|- style="background:#bfb"
| 129 || September 1 || @ Braves || 7–3 || Bubba Church (8–2) || Max Surkont (2–1) || None || 14,908 || 79–47–3
|- style="background:#bfb"
| 130 || September 2 || @ Braves || 2–0 || Curt Simmons (17–8) || Johnny Sain (17–11) || None || 17,230 || 80–47–3
|- style="background:#bbb"
| – || September 3 || @ Braves || colspan=6 | Postponed (rain); Makeup: September 25 as a traditional double-header
|- style="background:#fbb"
| 131 || September 4 (1) || Giants || 0–2 || Jim Hearn (8–2) || Robin Roberts (18–7) || None || see 2nd game || 80–48–3
|- style="background:#fbb"
| 132 || September 4 (2) || Giants || 0–9 || Sal Maglie (14–3) || Bob Miller (11–4) || None || 33,988 || 80–49–3
|- style="background:#fbb"
| 133 || September 6 (1) || Dodgers || 0–2 || Don Newcombe (17–8) || Bubba Church (8–3) || None || see 2nd game || 80–50–3
|- style="background:#fbb"
| 134 || September 6 (2) || Dodgers || 2–3 || Dan Bankhead (7–4) || Jim Konstanty (13–5) || None || 32,279 || 80–51–3
|- style="background:#fbb"
| 135 || September 7 || Dodgers || 2–3 || Carl Erskine (3–4) || Robin Roberts (18–8) || Ralph Branca (6) || 24,624 || 80–52–3
|- style="background:#bfb"
| 136 || September 8 || Dodgers || 4–3 || Russ Meyer (8–11) || Erv Palica (8–7) || None || 14,727 || 81–52–3
|- style="background:#bfb"
| 137 || September 9 || Braves || 7–6 || Jim Konstanty (14–5) || Dave Cole (0–1) || None || 15,329 || 82–52–3
|- style="background:#fbb"
| 138 || September 10 || Braves || 1–3 (5) || Johnny Sain (18–12) || Bubba Church (8–4) || None || 14,684 || 82–53–3
|- style="background:#bfb"
| 139 || September 12 || Cardinals || 1–0 || Robin Roberts (19–8) || Max Lanier (11–7) || None || 20,864 || 83–53–3
|- style="background:#bbb"
| – || September 13 || Cardinals || colspan=6 | Postponed (rain); Makeup: September 14
|- style="background:#bfb"
| 140 || September 14 || Cardinals || 3–2 || Jim Konstanty (15–5) || Al Brazle (10–7) || None || 17,142 || 84–53–3
|- style="background:#bfb"
| 141 || September 15 (1) || Reds || 2–1 || Ken Heintzelman (2–8) || Willie Ramsdell (8–13) || None || see 2nd game || 85–53–3
|- style="background:#bfb"
| 142 || September 15 (2) || Reds || 8–7 (19) || Blix Donnelly (1–4) || Eddie Erautt (3–2) || None || 20,673 || 86–53–3
|- style="background:#fbb"
| 143 || September 16 || Reds || 0–2 || Ewell Blackwell (15–15) || Bob Miller (11–5) || None || 12,052 || 86–54–3
|- style="background:#bfb"
| 144 || September 17 || Pirates || 5–3 || Russ Meyer (9–11) || Bill Werle (8–14) || Jim Konstanty (22) || 20,031 || 87–54–3
|- style="background:#fbb"
| 145 || September 19 || Cubs || 0–1 || Frank Hiller (11–5) || Robin Roberts (19–9) || None || 20,404 || 87–55–3
|- style="background:#bfb"
| 146 || September 20 || Cubs || 9–6 || Jim Konstanty (16–5) || Johnny Schmitz (10–15) || None || 4,259 || 88–55–3
|- style="background:#fbb"
| 147 || September 23 || Dodgers || 2–3 || Don Newcombe (19–10) || Robin Roberts (19–10) || None || 22,602 || 88–56–3
|- style="background:#fbb"
| 148 || September 24 || Dodgers || 0–11 || Erv Palica (12–7) || Bubba Church (8–5) || None || 32,190 || 88–57–3
|- style="background:#bfb"
| 149 || September 25 (1) || @ Braves || 12–4 || Ken Heintzelman (3–8) || Warren Spahn (21–16) || None || see 2nd game || 89–57–3
|- style="background:#fbb"
| 150 || September 25 (2) || @ Braves || 3–5 || Max Surkont (5–1) || Jim Konstanty (16–6) || None || 7,451 || 89–58–3
|- style="background:#bfb"
| 151 || September 26 || @ Braves || 8–7 || Blix Donnelly (2–4) || Bob Hall (0–2) || None || 1,987 || 90–58–3
|- style="background:#fbb"
| 152 || September 27 (1) || @ Giants || 7–8 (10) || Dave Koslo (13–15) || Jim Konstanty (16–7) || None || see 2nd game || 90–59–3
|- style="background:#fbb"
| 153 || September 27 (2) || @ Giants || 0–5 || Jim Hearn (11–4) || Bubba Church (8–6) || None || 10,004 || 90–60–3
|- style="background:#fbb"
| 154 || September 28 (1) || @ Giants || 1–3 || Sal Maglie (18–4) || Ken Heintzelman (3–9) || None || see 2nd game || 90–61–3
|- style="background:#fbb"
| 155 || September 28 (2) || @ Giants || 1–3 || Sheldon Jones (13–16) || Robin Roberts (19–11) || None || 7,984 || 90–62–3
|- style="background:#fbb"
| 156 || September 30 || @ Dodgers || 3–7 || Erv Palica (13–8) || Bob Miller (11–6) || None || 23,879 || 90–63–3
|-

|- style="background:#bfb"
| 157 || October 1 || @ Dodgers || 4–1 (10) || Robin Roberts (20–11) || Don Newcombe (19–11) || None || 35,073 || 91–63–3
|-

|-
| style="text-align:left;" |
The April 21, 1950, game ended after seven innings with the score tied 2–2, and an additional game was played on June 29.
The April 26, 1950, game was protested by the Phillies in the bottom of the tenth inning. The protest was later denied.
The second game on May 14 was suspended (Sunday curfew) after eight innings with the score 9–7 and was completed July 5, 1950, with new umpires.
The second game on July 2, 1950, ended after ten innings (Sunday curfew) with the score tied 8–8, and an additional game was played on September 6.
The August 12, 1950, game was protested by the Giants in the bottom of the fourth inning. The protest was later denied.
The second game on August 27, 1950, ended after eleven innings with the score tied 4–4, and an additional game was played on August 28.

Roster

Player stats

Batting

Starters by position 
Note: Pos = Position; G = Games played; AB = At bats; H = Hits; Avg. = Batting average; HR = Home runs; RBI = Runs batted in

Other batters 
Note: G = Games played; AB = At bats; H = Hits; Avg. = Batting average; HR = Home runs; RBI = Runs batted in

Pitching

Starting pitchers 
Note: G = Games pitched; IP = Innings pitched; W = Wins; L = Losses; ERA = Earned run average; SO = Strikeouts

Other pitchers 
Note: G = Games pitched; IP = Innings pitched; W = Wins; L = Losses; ERA = Earned run average; SO = Strikeouts

Relief pitchers 
Note: G = Games pitched; W = Wins; L = Losses; SV = Saves; ERA = Earned run average; SO = Strikeouts

1950 World Series 

AL New York Yankees (4) vs. NL Philadelphia Phillies (0)

Awards and honors 
Jim Konstanty, Associated Press Athlete of the Year, National League MVP
Eddie Sawyer, Associated Press Manager of the Year.
Eddie Waitkus, Associated Press Comeback Player of the Year.

Records 
Jim Konstanty, Major league single-season record (since broken), most wins by a relief pitcher (16)

Farm system 

LEAGUE CHAMPIONS: Terre Haute, Wilmington

Vandergrift club folded, July 20, 1950

References

Further reading

External links
1950 Philadelphia Phillies season at Baseball Reference

Philadelphia Phillies seasons
Philadelphia Phillies season
National League champion seasons
Philadelphia